Omar Sachedina (born August 21, 1982) is a Canadian television journalist and anchor for Bell Media. He is the Chief News Anchor and Senior Editor for CTV's national evening newscast CTV National News since September 5, 2022. Previously, Sachedina was the National Affairs Correspondent for CTV News.

Early life

Sachedina was born and raised in Vancouver to Ismaili Muslim parents who immigrated to Canada as Indians from Uganda. His great-grandparents emigrated to Africa from India in the late 1800s.  He speaks Gujarati, Kutchi, French, and English. At age 12, he grew an interest in journalism and submitted letters to the editors at various publications. Curious about his parents' East African homeland, Sachedina travelled there in 2005 to report and produce a PBS Frontline Fellowship feature documentary titled Uganda: The Return, exploring the return of Asians to Uganda after the 1972 expulsion.

Sachedina and his family were the focus of a CTV News Special Presentation titled Expelled: My Roots in Uganda. It aired November 4, 2022. 

Sachedina completed the International Baccalaureate Program while attending Port Moody Secondary School in Port Moody, British Columbia. He has a degree in Political Science and Philosophy from McGill University in Montreal, a Master of Science in Journalism from Columbia University in New York, and is a graduate of The Poynter Institute in St. Petersburg, Florida.

Career

Sachedina's work has appeared in the Vancouver Sun, The Province, the Toronto Star, The Globe and Mail, and CBC Radio. While a student, Sachedina was an intern at Global News in Vancouver and Montreal, as well as CNN International in London, England. He began his broadcasting career as a reporter for CTV Northern Ontario. He joined Citytv in July 2006, working on newscasts for both CityNews and CP24, where he remained until 2008.
 	
While at CP24, Sachedina covered the 2009 Federal Budget from Ottawa, anchored the 2008 Canadian Federal Election night coverage, anchored the 2008 U.S. Presidential Election Night, and President Barack Obama's inauguration.

CTV National News

Sachedina joined CTV National News as a correspondent in Toronto on September, 2009, and has reported from the United States, Jordan, Israel, France, Mexico and South Africa. He also travelled to London, England to cover the Royal Wedding of Prince William and Catherine Middleton in 2011. Later that year, Sachedina went to Oslo, Norway, to report on the murder of 77 people at a youth camp. In 2012, Sachedina reported breaking international news when he travelled to Newtown, Connecticut to cover the second deadliest school shooting in United States history, the Sandy Hook Elementary School shooting

Sachedina announced on Twitter on March 22, 2013, that he would be moving to Ottawa to assume the role of Parliamentary Correspondent. He returned to Toronto as National Affairs Correspondent for CTV National News in 2018, covering breaking news stories from around the world, including Ukraine during the war.

Sachedina was a frequent guest host on Canada AM, and contributed to CTVNews.ca and CTV's W5.  He also served frequently as a substitute anchor on CTV National News for Lisa LaFlamme and Sandie Rinaldo.

In 2022, he sat down with Mahmud Jamal, the first person of colour appointed to the Supreme Court of Canada.

On August 15, 2022, Sachedina was named chief news anchor and senior editor for CTV National News, replacing Lisa LaFlamme. Sachedina began anchoring the newscast on September 5, 2022.
On the day of his first broadcast, he addressed the controversy regarding LaFlamme's abrupt departure from the newscast.  A few days later, on September 8, Sachedina announced the death of Queen Elizabeth II.

Awards
Sachedina has received nominations for Best National Reporter at the Canadian Screen Awards. He was part of the CTV News team that received the 2020 RTNDA Canada Ron Laidlaw Award for continuing coverage of the opioid crisis.  Sachedina also received a nomination for a Daily Excellence award for his coverage of the 2018 Indonesia earthquake and tsunami.  In 2022, RTDNA recognized his story from Nunavik on the roots of Canada's first Indigenous Governor-General.   

Sachedina is the recipient of the 2010 RTNDA Canada President's Fellowship.

References

External links
 CTV Personalities - Omar Sachedina
 Twitter - Omar Sachedina
 Toronto Star - Omar Sachedina
 National Post Canada's Worthy 30 Omar Sachedina

1982 births
Canadian television reporters and correspondents
Canadian television news anchors
Living people
Canadian Ismailis
People from Vancouver
Canadian people of Gujarati descent
CTV Television Network people
21st-century Canadian journalists
Canadian people of Indian descent
Khoja Ismailism